Sanjukta Chakravorti is a geologist and palaeobiologist at the Geological Studies Unit, Indian Statistical Institute Kolkata, India where she is a senior research fellow and her research focuses on Gondwanan Geology and Triassic temnospondyl amphibians from India. She also actively works on palaeoecology and palaeobiology of marine vertebrates in India.

Biography 
Chakravorti received her undergraduate degree (B.Sc.) in geology (2012) and a master's degree (M.Sc.) in applied geology (2014) from the University of Calcutta. She has extensively revised maps of the Early, Middle and Late Triassic Gondwana Formations of all the four major Gondwana Basins in India. She initially joined the Indian Statistical Institute after being awarded the prestigious and competitive junior research fellowship (2014) and was subsequently awarded the senior research fellowship in 2016.

During her PhD, Chakravorti has been a visiting scientist studying vertebrate fossils at Teylers Museum, Haarlem, Netherlands (2016), Muséum National d'Histoire Naturelle (MNHN), Paris (2017), University of Opole, Poland and Institute of Palaeobiology, Polish Academy of Sciences (2018) and Department of Earth Science, Faculdade de Ciências e Tecnologia, Caparica, Portugal (2018).

She has active collaborations with University of Opole, Poland, University of Bonn, Germany;  Institut de Catala, Barcelona, Spain, University of California-Riverside, United States and Universidade Federal de Santa Maria · Departamento de Ecologia e Evolução, Brazil; Indian Institute of Technology, Kanpur, India.

A Woman in STEM 
Chakravorti is a staunch advocate of  interdisciplinary scientific research combined with outreach and aims to promote women in STEM and make STEM-based learning accessible to children from grassroot levels of society.

Chakravorti's discussion on her experience as a woman researcher in the Indian scientific community at the European Association of Vertebrate Palaeontology (EAVP) in 2018 earned her international accolades. Her work has promoted conservation of fossil sites in schools in rural and urban areas of India, organizing mass social awareness programmes. She convened the first keynote outreach programme organised in January 2020 at the Indian Statistical Institute  titled ‘বাংলার জীবাশ্ম’   – “Fossils of Bengal” targeted not only at preservation of fossil sites of Bengal but also promoting the importance of interdisciplinary sciences in younger generations. Her outreach has been covered by Anandabazar Patrika - a leading Bengali newspaper.

She has been mentioned as a young female vertebrate palaeontologist  in the book Rebels, Scholars, Explorers – Women in Vertebrate Paleontology – a book by Annalisa Berta and Susan Turner.

Key publications
 Chakravorti, Sanjukta, and Dhurjati Prasad Sengupta. "Taxonomy, morphometry and morphospace of cranial bones of Panthasaurus gen. nov. maleriensis from the Late Triassic of India." Journal of Iberian Geology 45.2 (2019): 317-340  cited 10 times.
 Teschner, Elżbieta M., et al. "Climatic influence on the growth pattern of Panthasaurus maleriensis from the Late Triassic of India deduced from paleohistology." PeerJ 8 (2020): e9868 .

References

External links 

Year of birth missing (living people)
Living people